Elamkulam or Ilamkulam may refer to:

 Elamkulam, Malappuram, a village in Malappuram district
 Elamkulam, Kochi, a region in Kochi, Ernakulam district
 Elamkulam Kunjan Pillai, south Indian historian